Caldervale is a rural locality in the Blackall-Tambo Region, Queensland, Australia.

Geography 
The ridge of the Great Dividing Range passes through Caldervale and creates a drainage divide. The north and south of the locality are within the Warrego River drainage basin which becomes part of the Murray-Darling basin which enters the Southern Ocean at Lake Alexandrina in South Australia. The west of the locality is within the Cooper Creek drainage basin which ultimately ends at Lake Eyre. The east of the locality is within the Fitzroy River drainage basin which flows into the Coral Sea south of Rockhampton. The Pluto Timber Reserve is in the east of the locality.

History 

Malta Provisional School opened in 1881 and closed in 1883. Malta is the name of the parish and a pastoral property in the west of Caldervale.

In 1934, the cattle station was quarantined due to an outbreak of pleuro-pneumonia among the cattle.

In 2014, Caldervale station, along with other pastoral properties owned by the Hughes family, became certified for its organic Wagyu beef production.

Education 
There are no schools in Caldervale. However, neighboroughing Tambo has a primary and junior secondary school (to Year 10). There is no senior secondary school in the area but distance education would be available through the School of the Air.

References

External links
 —shows the location of the Caldervale pastoral lease and homestead in 1912

Blackall-Tambo Region
Localities in Queensland